James Robinson (May 11, 1843 – March 22, 1933) was a justice of the North Dakota Supreme Court from 1917 to 1922.

Biography

Early years 
Born in Michigan, Robinson began his education in Canada, where he taught school for a short time.

He enlisted in the Union Army and served during the Civil War.

Legal career 
Robinson graduated from the Michigan State University College of Law on March 5, 1868 and thereafter engaged in the private practice of law in Wisconsin until 1883, during which time he also served a term as  District Attorney of Trempealeau County.

Robinson then moved to Fargo, in the Dakota Territory, where he resumed his private practice until 1916, when, at the age of 73, he was elected to a six-year term on the North Dakota Supreme Court.

While serving as a Justice, he wrote a weekly "Saturday Evening Letter" column about the work of the court for the Bismarck Tribune. He had an opposition to the doctrine of precedent and stare decisis, which attracted criticism upon his practice.

He became Chief Justice of North Dakota in 1921, but was defeated in a reelection attempt in 1922.

He then returned to the practice of law until poor health forced his retirement, in 1931.

References

1843 births
1933 deaths
Michigan State University College of Law alumni
Justices of the North Dakota Supreme Court
Chief Justices of the North Dakota Supreme Court
Union Army personnel